Free House (March 22, 1994 – July 19, 2004) was an American Thoroughbred racehorse that Blood-Horse Publications called one of the best California-bred horses of all time.

Background
Free House was a gray horse bred and raced by John Toffan & Trudy McCaffery. He was the best horse sired by Smokester who won two of his four races before being retired to stud.

Racing career
In 1997 Free House was the dominant three-year-old in California racing, winning the San Felipe Stakes and the most important Grade I Santa Anita Derby, both times defeating Silver Charm.

In the Kentucky Derby, the first leg of the U.S. Triple Crown series, bettors sent Free House off as a more than 10:1 sixth choice behind favorites Captain Bodgit, the Florida Derby and Wood Memorial Stakes winner, and Silver Charm, the second choice. Free House started the Derby on the outside in post position thirteen. The gray colt raced at or near the lead until the final furlong when Silver Charm and Captain Bodgit caught him, and he finished third.

In the Preakness Stakes, Free House beat third-place finisher Captain Bodgit and fourth-place Touch Gold but in a head-to-head stretch drive finished second by less than a head to Silver Charm. In the Belmont Stakes, by the time the horses reached the top of the stretch, Silver Charm and Free House were once again racing head-to-head but Touch Gold came on to win, denying Silver Charm the Triple Crown with Free House finishing third.

After the Triple Crown series, Free House finished third to Touch Gold in the Haskell Invitational Handicap at Monmouth Park. On his return to racing in California, he won the 1997 Swaps Stakes over Deputy Commander. In 1998, as well as a victory in the Grade III Bel Air Handicap, Free House beat Gentlemen and Touch Gold to win the Grade I Pacific Classic Stakes. Back on the track as a five-year-old in 1999, he won the San Antonio Handicap, then later in the year scored the biggest win of his career in the Santa Anita Handicap, defeating archrival Silver Charm.

Stud record
After his retirement from racing Free House stood at stud at Vessels Stallion Farm in Bonsall, California. On July 19, 2004 he was euthanized following an accident that fractured his skull. In his  brief stallion career, he led California's first-crop list in 2003 by progeny earnings and notably sired multiple stakes winner House of Fortune.

Pedigree

References

1994 racehorse births
2004 racehorse deaths
Racehorses bred in California
Racehorses trained in the United States
American Grade 1 Stakes winners
Thoroughbred family 8-g